Oyster River Cooperative School District (ORCSD) is a public school district in Durham, New Hampshire, United States, serving the towns of Durham, Lee, Madbury, and Barrington. Durham is home to the main campus of the University of New Hampshire. One of the first cooperative school districts established in the state of New Hampshire in 1954, ORCSD has a history of progressive educational philosophy, including heterogenous grouping and differentiated instruction. This tradition was recently affirmed by a strategic planning process which culminated in the district philosophy and vision statement. Serving around 2,000 students, the district consists of 2 elementary schools (one each in Lee and Madbury), a middle school, and a high school.  It has its own school administrative unit (SAU 5), with its own superintendent.

Schools
ORCSD consists of four schools:
Oyster River High School
Oyster River Middle School
Moharimet Elementary School in Madbury
Mast Way Elementary School in Lee

Administration
Dr. James Morse, Sr., Superintendent

School board
The school board for the Oyster River Cooperative School District consists of seven members, elected through a ballot vote in early march of each year. Serving staggered three-year terms, two members are re-elected each year for at-large seats, with three town-specific seats up for election every third year.

In 2018, the School Board voted to adopt Indigenous Peoples' Day on the second Monday of October.

References

External links
District home page

School districts in New Hampshire